Sulem Sarai is a locality/township of Allahabad, Uttar Pradesh, India.

References 

Neighbourhoods in Allahabad
Villages in Allahabad district
Caravanserais in India